Holocraspedon nigropunctum is a moth of the family Erebidae. It was described by George Hampson in 1893. It is found in Sri Lanka.

Description
Its wingspan is about 20 mm. In the male, the head, thorax and abdomen are white. Thorax spotted with black. Forewings are white, some specimens with a black costal base. A curved antemedial black line is present, where a spot in the cell and a spot at end of it can be seen. There is a postmedial line excurved round of cell and joining the antemedial line at inner margin. Some black streaks found beyond the postmedial line. There is a marginal series of short lines present. Apex is slightly suffused with fuscous. Cocoon is suspended by a cord and formed a network of strengthened by two cross bands.

References

 

Moths described in 1893
Lithosiini